Christopher Dale may refer to:
Dominic Dale (born Christopher Dale in 1971), Welsh snooker player and commentator
Chris Dale (footballer) (born 1950), English footballer
Chris Dale (cricketer) (born 1961), English cricketer
Chris Dale, bass guitarist formerly in bands including Atom Seed and Tank

See also